Heart of Stone is the nineteenth studio album by American singer-actress Cher, released on June 19, 1989 by Geffen Records. As of January 1991, the album has sold more than 4 million copies worldwide. The album was supported by her 1989-1990 Heart of Stone Tour.

Background
Heart of Stone was released in 1989 and was her second studio album for Geffen Records. As with her previous album Cher, Peter Asher, Jon Bon Jovi, Diane Warren, Guy Roche and Desmond Child performed songwriting and/or producing duties. Bonnie Tyler and Michael Bolton performed background vocals on the song "Emotional Fire", which was an outtake from Bolton's 1987 album The Hunger, as was "Starting Over" (Demo versions of both songs exist in bootleg form, and have surfaced on YouTube). The album was recorded in late 1988/early 1989, during the third year of Cher's relationship with Rob Camilletti, to whom she dedicated the album.

Heart of Stone reached number ten in the United States, number seven in the United Kingdom, and by topping the charts in Australia, Heart of Stone became Geffen's first international number one album. It was her first solo album in the United States (Sonny and Cher's debut album Look at Us reached number two and stayed there for eight weeks) to reach the top 10. Further on in her career, Cher would go on to have five more top ten albums - Believe, Living Proof, The Very Best of Cher, Closer to the Truth and Dancing Queen. The album has sold more than 3 million copies in the United States, with 964,000 of those units sold since early 1991, according to Nielsen SoundScan, which began counting actual sales that same year.

The album was first released with artwork and later re-released with more conventional studio photos. The original front cover album art is a painting by Octavio Ocampo that features Cher sitting beside a stone heart. However, when examined in its entirety and from a distance, it's clear this is also a painting of a human skull in profile (note the midriff folds in her dress forming the teeth; see infobox picture). The artwork was changed shortly after its release, making copies with the original artwork collector's items.

She recorded two other songs for the album, "Don't Come Cryin' to Me" and "Some Guys", but neither made the final cut. A remixed version of "Don't Come Cryin' to Me" was included on the Geffen compilation album If I Could Turn Back Time: Cher's Greatest Hits.  The reissue of that album, per Cher's request, does not include the song. A demo version of "Some Guys" was included on the "If I Could Turn Back Time" 7- and 12-inch singles.

"Heart of Stone" and "If I Could Turn Back Time" were both slightly remixed for the single.  The "Heart of Stone" remix is available on CD on the compilation If I Could Turn Back Time: Cher's Greatest Hits issued by Geffen Records.

"After All" was used as the love theme for the film Chances Are.

The album produced three top 10 hits as well as a top 20 hit with the title track.

Track listing

Personnel and production
Adapted taken from CD Booklet, 1989 Geffen Records

Track 1 Produced by Diane Warren & Guy Roche.
Recorded & Mixed by Frank Wolf and Gary S Edwards; assisted by Guy Roche
Drums, Percussion: Mark T. Williams; Bass guitar: John Pierce; Keyboards: Guy Roche, Alan Pasqua; Guitar: Steve Lukather, Glenn Sciurba, Gene Black; Backing vocals: Desmond Child, Michael Anthony, Robin Beck, Jean McClain, Jimmy Demers
Tracks 2, 7 & 9 Produced by Desmond Child and  Gary S Edwards 
Recorded & mixed by Sir Arthur Payson, with track 2 mixed by Mick Guzauski and  Gary Edwards 
Drums: Bobby Chouinard; Bass guitar: Hugh McDonald; Keyboards: Alan St. Jon (tracks 2 & 9), Eric Rehl (track 7); **Guitar: John McCurry, (tracks 2 & 9), John Putnam (track 2), Steve Lukather, Blues Saraceno (both track 7), Ron Mancuso (track 9)
Tracks 3, 5 & 10 Arranged & produced by Michael Bolton
Recorded by Frank Wolf; additional engineering by Roger Talkov, Terry Christian, Gary Edwards& Jay Healy. Mixed by Mick Guzauski
Drums: John Keane; Percussion on track 10: Bashiri Johnson; Bass guitar: Phillip Ashley (track 10; keyboards on all three tracks), Neil Stubenhaus (tracks 3 & 5); Keyboards: Robbie Buchanan (track 10); Guitar: Michael Landau (tracks 3, 5 & 10), John McCurry (track 5)
Tracks 4, 6 & 12 Produced by Peter Asher; associate producer on track 12: Frank Wolf and  Gary Edwards 
Recorded & mixed by Frank Wolf
Drums: Carlos Vega; Percussion: Michael Fisher, Peter Asher (both track 6); Bass guitar: Lee Sklar; Guitar: Waddy Wachtel, Mike Landau, Andrew Gold; Keyboards: Robbie Buchanan, Jon Gilutin; Saxophone on track 6: Dan Higgins
Tracks 8 & 11 Produced by Jon Lind
Recorded & mixed by Mick Guzauski, with engineering assistance by Gary Edwards, Frank Wolf & Paul Klingberg
Drums: John Keane; Percussion on track 11: Debra Dobkin; Bass guitar: John Pierce; Piano, synthesizer on track 8, Keyboards on track 11: John Schreiner; Additional synthesizer on track 8: Jim Lang; Guitar: Michael Thompson
Mastered by Dan Hersch; assisted by David Donnelly

Recording studios and assistant engineers
The Complex: Duane Seykora, Craig Porteils
Village Recorders: Jeff DeMorris, Charlie Brocco, Rob Hart, Charley Pollard
The Hit Factory: Rich Travali, Joe Pirrera, Dary Sulich, Barbera Milne, Tim Leitner, Paul Logus
Conway Recording: Richard McKernan, Debbie Johnson
Cherokee Studios: Jay Lean
Ocean Way: Stacy Baird, Clark Germaine
Summa Music Group: Ryan Dorn, Robin Laine, Paula "Max" Garcia
Bearsville: George Cowan
Electric Lady: Bridget Daly
Right Track: John Herman
Paradise Studios: Keith Goldstein
RPM Studios: "Iron" Mike Krowiak
Power Station: Ben Fowler
Criterion Studios: Mario Luccy
Bill Schnee Studios: Ken Allardyce
Studio Ultima: Tom Biener
Lion Share: Ray Pyle
Ignited Productions: Jeff Welch
Devonshire: Larry Goodwin
Special thanks to the Recording Virtuoso and creative master - Gary S Edwards "You are an amazing artist, incredible engineer and friend. Your patience is always the strength and spirit of anyone who gets to work with you" Cher

Charts

Weekly charts

Year-end charts

All-time charts

Certifications and sales

References

External links

1989 albums
Albums produced by Guy Roche
Albums produced by Peter Asher
Cher albums
Geffen Records albums